Jaimie Thibeault (born 23 September 1989) is a Canadian volleyball player. She is a member of the Canada women's national volleyball team.

She was part of the Canadian national team at the 2014 FIVB Volleyball Women's World Championship in Italy, and the 2015 FIVB Volleyball World Grand Prix.

She played for University of Montana, and in 2017 Jakarta BNI.

Clubs

References

External links 

 FIVB profile
 CEV profile 
  Italian league profile
 
 Team Canada profile

1989 births
Living people
Canadian women's volleyball players
Middle blockers
Montana Grizzlies and Lady Griz athletes
Expatriate volleyball players in the United States
Expatriate volleyball players in France
Expatriate volleyball players in Italy
Expatriate volleyball players in Poland
Expatriate volleyball players in Indonesia
Canadian expatriate sportspeople in the United States
Canadian expatriate sportspeople in France
Canadian expatriate sportspeople in Italy
Canadian expatriate sportspeople in Poland
Canadian expatriate sportspeople in Indonesia